Dancin' on Coals is the second album by the hard rock band Bang Tango, released in 1991.

The album peaked at No. 113 on the Billboard 200. A single, "Untied and True", was a minor hit. Bang Tango supported the album by opening for Cheap Trick on a North American tour.

Production
The album was produced by John Jansen. The Uptown Horns contributed to "Soul to Soul".

Critical reception

Entertainment Weekly wrote that "funk weaves its way seductively through nearly every song, and the production is sharp and slick." The Los Angeles Times opined that "if the Cult was the Beatles, Goth-obsessed Bang Tango would be Badfinger: too close to the original to really matter but with enough twists of its own to resist easy dismissal." The Record determined that Bang Tango "moves slightly away from the thunderous backbeats and heavy guitar sounds that characterized its first effort to spotlight a smooth, seductive funk groove."

The St. Petersburg Times thought that "'Emotions in Gear' is the record's best work, a seductive song whose melodic chorus is countered by furious verses." The Chicago Tribune concluded that "although singer Joe LeSte's lyrics are painfully bad at times ('Oh, my little philly, I'm gonna ride you'), the album is mostly a lot of raw, energetic fun." The Calgary Herald lamented that "as much as Bang Tango create a sense of musical adventure, they never scale any peaks previously unconquered ... Their great approach doesn't translate into great songs, only gratifying moments."

Spin deemed the album a hair metal essential, writing that it molds "goth-rock moods into urgently horny soul-metal."

Track listing 
 "Soul to Soul" – 4:14
 "Untied and True" – 4:50
 "Emotions in Gear" – 5:02
 "I'm in Love" – 3:33
 "Big Line" – 3:30
 "Midnight Struck" – 7:02
 "Dancin' on Coals" – 5:24
 "My Saltine" – 2:49
 "Dressed Up Vamp" – 4:37
 "Last Kiss" – 5:58
 "Cactus Juice" – 3:57

References 

1991 albums
Bang Tango albums
MCA Records albums